There were 8 Shooting events at the 2006 South American Games in Buenos Aires, Argentina. Four for men and four for women.

Medal summary

Medal table

Medallists
Men

Women's events

References

2006 South American Games events
2006
2006 in shooting sports